Siah Dasht-e Sofla (also Romanized as Sīāh Dasht-e Soflá; also known as Sīāh Dasht-e Pā’īn) is a village in Farim Rural District, Dodangeh District, Sari County, Mazandaran Province, Iran. At the 2006 census, its population was 66, in 21 families.

References 

Populated places in Sari County